T-Mobile UK was a mobile network operator in the UK. First launched as Mercury One2One (stylised one2one) on 7 September 1993, the network was originally operated by Mercury Communications. one2one was purchased by Deutsche Telekom in 1999, who rebranded it with their global T-Mobile brand name in 2002.

In 1999, one2one became the world's first network to provide wireless network infrastructure to a mobile virtual network operator when Virgin Mobile was launched as a joint venture between one2one and Virgin Group.

In 2010, it merged with Orange UK to form a joint venture, Everything Everywhere, in 2010, which continued to operate the T-Mobile and Orange brands until March 2015 and allowed T-Mobile customers to utilise Orange's 2G signal and vice versa.

In 2012, Everything Everywhere launched their new network branding as EE. T-Mobile sims remain fully supported by EE, who are ultimately owned by BT since they acquired the company in January 2016 for £12.5 billion.

History 

The network was originally launched as Mercury One2One, a GSM mobile network operated by the now-defunct Mercury Communications. It was the world's first GSM 1800 network when it was launched in September 1993. It was later rebranded as simply One2One, when it was operated for a short time as a joint venture between Cable & Wireless plc and American cable provider Mediaone Group, which had a number of investments in Britain dating back to its days as the US West Media Group. The network was purchased by Deutsche Telekom in 1999 and rebranded as T-Mobile in summer 2002.

T-Mobile offered both pay-as-you-go and pay-monthly contract phones. The pay-monthly contracts consisted of set numbers of minutes and 'flexible boosters' which allow the customer to change them month to month depending on their needs. Prior to this T-Mobile had a contract option known as 'Flext' which gave the user an amount of money to use for calls, texts, MMS and mobile internet as necessary. This was withdrawn in early 2010. There is no warning when pay-monthly customers exceed their monthly inclusive limit, leading to unexpectedly large bills. T-Mobile launched their 3G UMTS services in the Autumn of 2003.

On 12 December 2007, it was confirmed that a merger of the high-speed 3G and HSDPA networks operated by T-Mobile UK and 3 was to take place starting January 2008. This resulted in T-Mobile and 3 having the largest HSDPA mobile phone network in the country, with HSDPA access initially restricted to Web'n'Walk Plus customers and above.

Merger with Orange UK

On 8 September 2009 France Télécom's Orange and T-Mobile parent Deutsche Telekom announced they were in advanced talks to merge their UK operations to create the largest mobile operator with 37% of the market. The long-term future of either brand was unclear, though EE stated that both would be retained for the first eighteen months at least. In 2013, parent company EE began to withdraw the T-Mobile brand, with the website closed and redirected to EE. As of February 2015, new T-Mobile connections are no longer possible for new customers, T-Mobile active sims remain supported by EE.

Consumer Focus and the Communications Consumer Panel sent a joint letter to the then Competition Commissioner Neelie Kroes in December 2009 asking for the merger to be investigated by authorities in the United Kingdom, rather than Brussels. The British Office of Fair Trading joined this call by asking the EU to allow it to investigate the proposed deal in February 2010, saying that it believed the merger could have a 'significant' effect on competition.
On 1 March 2010 the European Commission approved the merger, on the condition that the combined company sell 25% of the spectrum it owns on the 1800 MHz radio band and amend a network sharing agreement with smaller rival 3.
On 1 April 2010 Deutsche Telekom and France Télécom finalised the deal and completed the merger of their UK based operations, causing Orange UK and T-Mobile UK to cease to exist as companies, although they continued as brands.

On 11 May 2010 it was announced that both the Orange and T-Mobile brands would remain on British high streets, although their new merged parent company will be called EE.

In September 2012, T-Mobile's parent company EE announced that all Orange and T-Mobile stores were to be re-branded as 'EE' stores by 30 October 2012, the launch date of their 4G network, offering products from all three brands of the company. As a result, there are around 700 EE stores open in the UK. As of February 2015, EE stores only offer EE products, with T-Mobile services withdrawn.

T-Mobile's UK network was also used as the backbone network behind Virgin Mobile UK (the world's first virtual mobile operator), for both 2G and 3G signals. Post-merger, Virgin Mobile continued to run on the EE network until they migrated to Vodafone.

On March 26, 2014, the T-Mobile UK website was closed and redirected to the EE website (although it now redirects to the Deutsche Telekom website). In February 2015, T-Mobile UK and Orange UK tariffs were no longer offered to new or upgrading customers. Existing T-Mobile UK plans continue to use EE's 2G and 3G networks.

In January 2016 BT acquired EE for £12.5 billion.

Mobile broadband fair use policy change
Effective 1 February 2011 T-Mobile UK lowered their fair-use capacity limit on Internet usage from 3GB to 500MB per month and clarified that Internet access using their mobile broadband service in reality only allows browsing the Internet using static websites. T-Mobile says:

"Browsing means looking at websites and checking email, but not watching videos, downloading files or playing games. We've got a fair use policy but ours means that you'll always be able to browse the Internet, it's only when you go over the fair use amount that you won't be able to download, stream and watch video clips."

This will effectively limit customers ability to use services such as Video chat/conference, Online streaming radio/TV news etc. or accessing e-mail attachments and playing online games or even downloading updates.

The initial reports were that this was for all users, but after threats of contract breaches it was announced that it would apply to new and upgrading customers only - existing contracts would be honoured.

2009 data breach
In November 2009, T-Mobile UK was the subject of an investigation by the Information Commissioner's Office following the involvement of some T-Mobile employees in the illegal trade of personal data of millions of customers, in breach of the Data Protection Act 1998.

On 17 November 2009, T-Mobile admitted that it faced a consumer backlash after it was revealed that due to its own lax data security controls an employee had been selling customer data to third party companies. The mobile operator admitted that one of their own employees is facing prosecution after selling personal details of thousands of British customers to rival companies in a major breach of UK data protection laws. UK Information Commissioner Christopher Graham said the data was sold for “substantial amounts of money” to brokers working for other mobile phone companies. The privacy watchdog said it planned to prosecute and would push for jail terms for anyone convicted. Rival companies bought the information and used it to make cold calls to the customers offering them a new contract with a new network.

References

External links

Deutsche Telekom
Orange S.A.
1993 establishments in the United Kingdom
Companies based in Welwyn Hatfield
Telecommunications companies established in 1993
Companies disestablished in 2010
Hatfield, Hertfordshire
Mobile phone companies of the United Kingdom
2010 disestablishments in the United Kingdom